Kitayosce is a football club based in Tabora, the capital of Tanzania's Tabora Region. The team  plays in the Tanzanian Championship.

History 
Kilimanjaro Talented Youth Sports Centre (Kitayosce) football club was founded in Ruangwa, one of the six districts of Lindi Region, Bukoba. It was later bought by the current chairman, Yusuf Kitumbo while featuring in the First League. It moved to Tabora Municipal. In 2018-19 season, they finished second in second division under the guidance of assistant coach, Ally John Shangalu and were promoted to the championship for the first time.

Personnel 
They are coached by Kefa Kisala, a former coach of Masaka LC FC, Express FC, URA FC, BUL FC, Wakiso Giants, UPDF FC and The Cranes assistant coach.

Colors and badge 
Kitayosce colors are blue and white at home and green and white away. The Kitayosce FC badge has the acronym emblazoned around an image of Mount Kilimanjaro,sunrays on a football and the full name of the club.

Stadium 

Kitayosce play their home matches at the Ali Hassan Mwinyi stadium,Tabora.

Supporters 
They draw their fan base from Tabora district's population of 226,999.

Squad

References

External links 
 
Football clubs in Tanzania
Association football clubs established in 1982
Arusha